Catoptria domaviellus is a species of moth in the family Crambidae described by Hans Rebel in 1904. It is found in Bosnia and Herzegovina, Serbia and Montenegro, the Republic of Macedonia and Bulgaria.

References

Crambini
Moths of Europe
Moths described in 1904